Pohjonen is a Finnish surname. Notable people with the surname include:

Aarne Pohjonen (1886–1938), Finnish gymnast
Mauno Pohjonen (1907–1987), Finnish agronomist and politician
Kimmo Pohjonen (born 1964), Finnish accordionist

Finnish-language surnames